Centropagidae is a family of copepods in the order Calanoida. Its members are particularly known as plankton in coastal waters and in fresh water in Australia and southern South America. They are also found on subantarctic islands and in lakes in Antarctica.

Genera
There are 14 genera recognised in the family Centropagidae, including over 130 species. 
Boeckella De Guerne & Richard, 1889 — 49 species, freshwater 
Calamoecia Brady, 1906 — 18 species, freshwater 
Centropages Krøyer, 1849 — 35 species, marine 
Dussartopages Huys, 2009 — 1 species, marine 
Gippslandia Bayly & Arnott, 1969 — 1 species, marine 
Gladioferens Henry, 1919 — 6 species, marine  
Guernella Giesbrecht in G & Schmeil, 1898 — 1 species, marine 
Hemiboeckella G. O. Sars, 1912 — 3 species, freshwater 
Isias Boeck, 1865 — 4 species, marine 
Limnocalanus G. O. Sars, 1863 — 2 species, marine / brackish water 
Neoboeckella Bayly, 1992 — 2 species, marine 
Osphranticum Forbes, 1882 — 2 species, marine 
Parabroteas Mrázek, 1901 — 1 species, marine 
Sinocalanus Burckhardt, 1913 — 7 species, marine / brackish water

References

External links

 
Calanoida
Crustacean families